La Porte Independent School District is a school district based in La Porte, Texas, United States.

The district serves the cities of La Porte, Morgan's Point, and Shoreacres, a small portion of Pasadena, and a small portion of Deer Park. The district includes Lomax, which was once an incorporated city but is now a part of the city of La Porte.

In addition to Harris County, the district's territory extends into water within Chambers County.

In 2011, La Porte ISD's Lomax Elementary won the national Blue Ribbon school award.
In 2017, Jennie Reid Elementary also won the prestigious award.

School board

The current superintendent of La Porte ISD is Dr. Walter Jackson.

 David Janda - President
 Russell Schoppe - Vice President
 Jeff Martin - Secretary
 Melissa Crutcher - Trustee
 Danny Hanks - Trustee
 Chris Murdock- Trustee
 Dee Anne Thompson - Trustee

History

La Porte Independent School District was formed in 1916 and a new three-story red-brick building was constructed near Broadway and "C" streets which would house the bused-in additional students from Lomax and Morgan's Point. In 1917, the student body selected orange and white as the school colors, the bulldog as the school mascot and published a one-time-only yearbook Etropal, which is La Porte spelled backwards.

During the years of the depression, 1918-1924 that followed in the wake of World War I many citizens were unable to pay their taxes, and as a result, the school term lasted only six months.

In 1921, Mr. C. E. Wade was appointed principal, and he organized the first football team, orchestra, choral club and "mothers' club" during his first year. In 1935, the second yearbook, The LPHS Daze, had a one-time publication by Lynnwood Anderson, editor-in-chief; there was not another yearbook published until 1946 and it was named The Reflector as it stands to date.

In 1940, La Porte Elementary was built to accommodate students in grades one through six. The existing building continued to house grades seven through twelve. In 1943, disaster struck the system in the form of "The 1943 Hurricane." The top two floors were severely damaged and were removed. The remaining first floor was repaired and 12 classrooms, cafeteria, music rooms, manual training room, athletic dressing rooms and showers, storage units and a tax office were added to make this the junior high and high school.

In 1945, a new gymnasium/auditorium was constructed on Broadway between the elementary school and the newly remodeled school. A new high school was also built that year which is now the old part of La Porte Junior High. In 1948, the elementary school had a new wing added and a new Intermediate school was built. For the first time the La Porte educational system had a complete school unit housing and segregating primary, intermediate, and secondary levels.

History records that La Porte was not unique in the country in that its schools were segregated until the 1960s, but its transition to an integrated system was quite remarkable. Paralleling the history of the all-white schools, La Porte black students were housed in temporary facilities until a school of their own was built and until they joined the all-white students in the district's schools. In 1909, a Baptist church was used during the week for black students and later a Methodist church was purchased for their use by the La Porte Independent School District. Miss Viola DeWalt was the first teacher of this school. In 1953, DeWalt Elementary was opened as a neighborhood school for black children and grades one through eight were taught in this building. Grades nine through twelve were sent by bus to Carver High School in Baytown, Texas. The La Porte school system was one of the first districts in the country to fully integrate its student body and facilities in 1963–1964. This set an important precedent of peaceful desegregation for the state as well as the country.

The school district purchased  in 1959 on "J" Street (now Fairmont Parkway) and built a new La Porte High School, housing grades nine through twelve. The old high school then became the La Porte Junior High as it stands today.

In 1963, the first fully air-conditioned school in the district, James H. Baker Elementary, was opened for students in the Fairmont Park area. This school later became Baker Junior High, but is now the sixth grade campus for the entire district.

In 1964, the high school added a planetarium, and "E" building wing, and in 1972 a new library wing was added. Since 1966, the district has changed boundaries, annexed several communities, and built and remodeled campuses all over the city. For students in the south Bayshore and Shoreacres areas, Bayshore Elementary was opened in 1966; students in the college park area were sent to College Park Elementary(1969); students in Lomax (annexed by La Porte as West La Porte) were sent to the newly built Lomax Elementary in 1976. Jennie Reid Elementary 1977 and Leo Rizzuto Elementary Schools were built to accommodate the students in the Fairmont Park area(1981). Lomax Junior High was built in 1986 to accommodate the growth that La Porte Junior High could not support. Over the years the La Porte High School has expanded to include: The Sonja Angelo Theater, a basketball gymnasium, swimming pool complex, vocational building, student center and the Henry Einfeldt Band Hall. In 1996, a new field house and a science building were added. The La Porte Independent School District has come a long way from a one-room classroom to twelve separate campuses and a city population of over 31,880 and growing.

Schools

Secondary schools

High schools
 La Porte High School (La Porte)
 La Porte ISD Academy of Viola DeWalt High School (La Porte)

Junior high schools

7-8
 La Porte Junior High School (La Porte)
 Lomax Junior High School (La Porte)

6
 James H. Baker Sixth Grade Campus (La Porte)

Elementary schools
 Bayshore (La Porte)
 College Park (Deer Park)
 Heritage (Deer Park)
 La Porte (La Porte)
 Lomax (La Porte)
 Jennie Reid (La Porte)
 Leo A. Rizzuto (La Porte)

Other facilities
 La Porte ISD Administration Building  
 Instructional Technology Center
 Support Services Center
 Special Programs

References

External links

School districts in Harris County, Texas
School districts in Chambers County, Texas
La Porte, Texas
Education in Pasadena, Texas
1916 establishments in Texas
School districts established in 1916